The Delger mörön is a river in the Khövsgöl aimag in northern Mongolia. It rises in the Ulaan Taiga range close to the Russian border.

Together with the Ider River, it is the headwaters of the Selenge River. It meets with the Ider at Tömörbulag, thereafter becoming the Selenge. 

The Delger mörön is frozen for 128–175 days through the year. There is a ferry in Bayanzürkh, and a concrete bridge just south of Mörön.

See also 
List of rivers of Mongolia

References

M. Nyamaa, Khövsgöl aimgiin lavlakh toli, Ulaanbaatar 2001, p. 77
www.medeelel.mn: Дэлгэр мөрөн

Rivers of Mongolia
Khövsgöl Province
Rivers of Tuva